The 1957 New York Yankees season was the 55th season for the team. The team finished with a record of 98–56 to win their 23rd pennant, finishing eight games ahead of the Chicago White Sox. New York was managed by Casey Stengel. The Yankees played their home games at Yankee Stadium.

In the World Series, the Yankees were defeated by the Milwaukee Braves in seven games. They lost the crucial seventh game in Yankee Stadium to the starting pitcher for the Braves, Lew Burdette, who was selected the World Series Most Valuable Player based on this and his other two victories in the Series.

Phil Rizzuto, the former team shortstop from the early 50s, joined the broadcast team for the radio and television broadcasts taking over from Jim Woods in what would be the first of many seasons as a Yankees broadcaster.

Offseason
 October 15, 1956: Bob Cerv was purchased from the Yankees by the Kansas City Athletics.
 December 11, 1956: Charlie Silvera and cash were traded by the Yankees to the Chicago Cubs for a player to be named later. The Cubs completed the deal by sending Harry Chiti to the Yankees on December 14.
 February 19, 1957: Irv Noren, Milt Graff, Mickey McDermott, Tom Morgan, Rip Coleman, Billy Hunter, and a player to be named later were traded by the Yankees to the Kansas City Athletics for Art Ditmar, Bobby Shantz, Jack McMahan, Wayne Belardi, and players to be named later. The Yankees completed their part of the deal by sending Jack Urban to the Athletics on April 5. The Athletics completed the deal by sending Curt Roberts to the Yankees on April 4 and Clete Boyer to the Yankees on June 4.

Regular season

Season standings

Record vs. opponents

Notable transactions
 May 26, 1957: Tommy Lasorda was purchased from the Yankees by the Brooklyn Dodgers.
 June 15, 1957: Ralph Terry, Woodie Held, Billy Martin, and Bob Martyn were traded by the Yankees to the Kansas City Athletics for Ryne Duren, Jim Pisoni, and Harry Simpson.
 September 10, 1957: Bobby Del Greco was purchased by the Yankees from the Chicago Cubs.

Roster

Player stats

Batting

Starters by position
Note: Pos = Position; G = Games played; AB = At bats; H = Hits; Avg. = Batting average; HR = Home runs; RBI = Runs batted in

Other batters
Note: G = Games played; AB = At bats; H = Hits; Avg. = Batting average; HR = Home runs; RBI = Runs batted in

Pitching

Starting pitchers
Note: G = Games pitched; IP = Innings pitched; W = Wins; L = Losses; ERA = Earned run average; SO = Strikeouts

Other pitchers
Note: G = Games pitched; IP = Innings pitched; W = Wins; L = Losses; ERA = Earned run average; SO = Strikeouts

Relief pitchers
Note: G = Games pitched; W = Wins; L = Losses; SV = Saves; ERA = Earned run average; SO = Strikeouts

1957 World Series 

NL Milwaukee Braves (4) vs. AL New York Yankees (3)

Awards and honors
 Mickey Mantle, American League MVP
All-Star Game

Farm system

LEAGUE CHAMPIONS: Denver, Alexandria

Notes

References
1957 New York Yankees at Baseball Reference
1957 World Series
1957 New York Yankees at Baseball Almanac

New York Yankees seasons
New York Yankees
New York Yankees
1950s in the Bronx
American League champion seasons